Lievegem is a municipality in the Belgian province of East Flanders that arose on 1 January 2019 from the merging of the municipalities of Waarschoot, Lovendegem and Zomergem.

The merged municipality has an area of 80.78 km² and is home to 26,441 inhabitants as of 2021. A referendum was held for the new name of the municipality, and 55% voted for Lievegem (literally Lieve Canal settlement).

Lievegem consists of the following deelgemeentes (sub-municipalities): Lovendegem, Vinderhoute, Waarschoot, and Zomergem.

Gallery

References

External links 
 
 Official site

 
Municipalities of East Flanders
Populated places established in 2019